Liu Dongsheng (1917–2008), also known as Tung-sheng Liu, was a Chinese geologist. He graduated from department of geology of National Southwestern Associated University in 1942 and studied at department biology of National Central University (Nanjing University) from 1946 to 1949. He was a professor at the department of Chemistry, Tsinghua University, Beijing. He was a research fellow at Institute of Vertebrate Paleontology and Paleoanthropology, and then Institute of Geology and Geophysics, Chinese Academy of Sciences.

Liu was elected an academician of the Chinese Academy of Sciences (CAS) in 1980, and a member of the Third World Academy of Sciences (TWAS) in 1991. In 2002, he was the recipient of Tyler Prize for Environmental Achievement. In 2003, Liu received the State Preeminent Science and Technology Award, the highest scientific prize awarded in China.

1917 births
2008 deaths
20th-century Chinese geologists
Educators from Liaoning
Members of the Chinese Academy of Sciences
Nanjing University alumni
National Central University alumni
National Southwestern Associated University alumni
People from Shenyang
Scientists from Liaoning
TWAS fellows